Elachista saarelai is a moth of the family Elachistidae that is endemic to southern Finland.

The larvae feed on Carex digitata and possibly Carex pediformis. They mine the leaves of their host plant. The mine starts from the middle of the length of the leaf and is directed upwards. The larva hibernates within this mine and continues mining in the same leaf during spring. By the end of June, the mine occupies the whole width of the leaf, and is turned downwards after reaching the tip of the leaf. It mines until August or September and then hibernates within the mine for the second time. Pupation takes place outside of the mine on a leaf of the host plant.

References

saarelai
Moths described in 2010
Endemic fauna of Finland
Moths of Europe